Gary Lee Waslewski (born July 21, 1941) is a former American professional baseball player who played as a pitcher from 1967 to 1972. He accrued an 11–26 win–loss record, plus 5 saves in his career, with an ERA of 3.44.

Career
Waslewski made his major league debut in 1967 with the Boston Red Sox. In 1968, he was one of 10 pitchers who led the American League (AL) with a perfect 1.000 fielding percentage. He started Game 6 of the 1967 World Series for the Red Sox.  On December 3, 1968, he was traded by the Red Sox to the St. Louis Cardinals for Ducky Schofield. On June 3 the following season, he was traded by the Cardinals to the Montreal Expos for Mudcat Grant. On May 15, 1970, he was traded by the Expos to the New York Yankees for Dave McDonald. Released by the Yankees on April 3, 1972, he signed as a free agent on May 15, 1972, with the Oakland Athletics.

Waslewski also played winter baseball with the Navegantes del Magallanes club of the Venezuelan League in the 1965-66 season. There he hurled a 16-inning, 3–2 victory, the third-most innings pitched in a game in league history, behind Johnny Hetki (18, in 1951-52) and Alex Carrasquel (17, in 1946).

Personal life
Waslewski attended Berlin High School in Berlin, Connecticut and the University of Connecticut.

His elder son, Gary Jr., was a pitcher at Princeton University before becoming an orthopedic surgeon in the Arizona area, specializing in sports medicine.

References

External links
, or Retrosheet, or SABR Biography Project, or Pura Pelota (Venezuelan Winter League)

1941 births
Living people
American expatriate baseball players in Canada
Asheville Tourists players
Baseball players from Connecticut
Boston Red Sox players
UConn Huskies baseball players
Hobbs Pirates players
Iowa Oaks players
Kingsport Pirates players
Kinston Eagles players
Major League Baseball pitchers
Montreal Expos players
Navegantes del Magallanes players
American expatriate baseball players in Venezuela
New York Yankees players
Oakland Athletics players
Pawtucket Red Sox players
People from Meriden, Connecticut
Pittsfield Red Sox players
Reno Silver Sox players
St. Louis Cardinals players
Syracuse Chiefs players
Toronto Maple Leafs (International League) players
Tucson Toros players
University of Connecticut alumni